The siege of Kraljevo was the most important battle during the uprising in Serbia in 1941. The siege lasted from 9 to 31 October 1941. The battle was waged between besieging forces of the Chetniks and Yugoslav Partisans against German forces garrisoned in Kraljevo in the German-occupied territory of Serbia (modern-day Serbia).

The rebel forces had between 3,000 and 4,000 soldiers. The battle started on 9 October 1941 when Chetniks attacked German forces near Monastery of Žiča. Several days after the battle began in reprisal for the attack on a German garrison, the German forces committed a massacre of approximately 2,000 civilians in the period between 15 and 20 October, in an event known as the Kraljevo massacre.

On 23 October most of the Partisan forces left the siege of Kraljevo and regrouped their forces to attack Chetniks in Čačak, Užice and Požega. The rebels organized their last larger attack on Kraljevo on 31 October, using two tanks previously captured from German forces, but failed after suffering heavy casualties.

In early November most of the Chetnik forces besieging Kraljevo retreated to reinforce their positions in other towns in Western Serbia attacked by communist forces. On 20 November 1941 both rebel formations signed truce only to be soon again defeated by German offensive in December 1941 that forced Partisans to leave Serbia and Mihailović and his Chetniks to flee constant German chases.

Eventually, Soviet Red Army and Partisan forces captured Kraljevo in autumn 1944, killed at least 240 people in communist purges and established communist regime which lasted for about fifty years. The propaganda created by the winning Partisans was almost completely opposed to real events. The official Partisan historiography considered Chetniks as most responsible for the failed siege, presenting them as deceitful and untrustworthy with minimal combat value. On the other hand, the Partisans were depicted as heroically brave despite all odds at retaking the city.

Background 
The attack on Kraljevo was one of the battles waged during the anti-Axis uprising in German-occupied Western Serbia, then part of the Axis occupied Yugoslavia. At the beginning of October 1941 military units of Yugoslav Army in the Fatherland and groups of communist rebels established Operational Headquarters after they first captured German-occupied Čačak. The representatives of the Yugoslav Army in this HQ were Major Radoslav Đurić and Captain Jovan Deroko, while communist representatives were Ratko Mitrović and Momčilo Mole Radosavljević. This Operational Headquarters decided to move their troops toward Kraljevo and prepare to capture it.

Involved forces 
The Axis forces included:
 the headquarters of 749th Infantry regiment with one battalion
 6th and 7th companies of the II Battalion of the 737th Jäger Regiment 
 670th Artillery Division
 The 522 sapper squad of 714th Jäger Division
 parts of units retreated from Užice, Požega and Čačak

The Yugoslav Army forces had between 3,000 and 4,000 soldiers. They were organized in following detachments:

 the Jelica Chetnik Detachment, commanded by Lieutenant Jovan Bojović, an active officer of the Yugoslav Royal Army 
 the Bukovik Chetnik Detachment under command of Lieutenant Dušan Đokić 
 the Ibar Chetnik Detachment
 the Chetnik Detachment of Death commanded by Simo Uzelac, and
 the Žiča Chetnik Detachment was commanded by Dušan Laušević.

The forces of the Communist Party of Yugoslavia were organized in three units:Dragačevo Battalion, Ljubić Battalion and Jovan Kursula Detachment.

On the meeting in the village Slatina, the Yugoslav Army reached agreement with communists to act together. The rebel headquarters was Ružić Hill which is about 7 km South-West of Kraljevo. The commander of the rebel forces was Major Radoslav Đurić, while the chief of the staff was Jovan Deroko. Deroko was commander of all rebel forces at the left bank of Western Morava and right bank of Ibar, while Jovan Bojović was commander of all rebel forces on the right bank of Morava and left bank of Ibar.

On 3 October 1941 German military commander of occupied Serbia Franz Böhme ordered to unconditionally defend Kraljevo. On 7 October Draža Mihailović ordered full battle readiness in villages surrounding Kraljevo.

Battle

Clashes near Monastery of Žiča 
The first skirmishes within the battle for Kraljevo began in the early afternoon on 9 October near Monastery of Žiča when the Chetnik unit commanded by Milutin Janković attacked German unit which retreated to Kraljevo after a whole day battle in which Germans used canons to shell the monastery. On 10 October German air forces bombarded the Monastery of Žiča using five airplanes and significantly damaged its church. The battle near monastery lasted until the early morning of 11 October when Germans broke the rebel lines and put the monastery to fire.

Siege 
On 10 October the rebel forces completely surrounded Kraljevo and began its siege. On 12 October the 717th Jäger Division left Kragujevac to help besieged garrison in Kraljevo and reached Trstenik on the same day. On 13 October they reached Vrnjačka Banja and villages near Kraljevo. On 15 October they clashed with Chetnik forces on the outskirts of Kraljevo. After 45 minutes of artillery barrage, the Jelica Chetnik Detachment commanded by Jovan Bojović on the right wing and Ljubić Partisan Battalion on the left wing attacked North-West German positions in the first hours of 15 October and captured Agriculture School. One platoon of Dragačevo Partisans attacked Kraljevo from the direction of the road toward Raška. After one hour of fighting, rebels reached the court and church buildings in the city center. The German right wing attacked rebels forcing them to retreat and encircling Jelica Chetnik Detachment which was almost completely annihilated. In this battle Jovan Bojović was killed. Miloje Mojsilović succeeded him on the position of commander of Jelica Chetnik Detachment.

Between 15 and 20 October 1941 German forces killed approximately 2,000 civilians in reprisal for a joint Partisan–Chetnik attack on a German garrison in an event known as the Kraljevo massacre. On 19 October 1941 Chetnik officer Predrag Raković reported his commander in Čačak, Captain Bogdan Marjanović that his men are disturbed by the news about communist violence in Ljubić county and that they threatened with desertion if this violence continues. The rebel artillery shelled western and central part of the town on 19 and 20 October from Partisan held positions on Ružić hill.

On 28 October 1941 the commander of the Yugoslav Army in the Fatherland Draža Mihailović received an order from Prime Minister of the Yugoslav Government in exile Dušan Simović who adjured Mihailović to eschew premature actions and avoid reprisals. Two German battalions reinforced with two tanks attacked Partisan positions on Ružić hill in early morning of 21 October. The Partisans flee their positions leaving their two cannons on the hill. The German forces continue with their advances through positions deserted by Partisans and attack Chetnik positions killing many Chetnik soldiers before they retreated back to Kraljevo in early afternoon on the same day.

The last larger attack on Kraljevo happened on 31 October 1941 when attacking Partisan and Chetnik forces tried to penetrate German positions and enter into city using two tanks. For some time the historiography attributed this action solely to Partisans, but later this was corrected and participation of Chetniks was recognized. About 130 people died on the rebels' side, both Chetnik and Partisan. Most of rebel casualties were on the Chetnik side. During the attack on German positions in the Farming School Chetnik Lieutenant Bojović was killed. Chetnik Lieutenant Sima Uzelac and about a dozen of his soldiers were killed by machine gun while trying to cross barbed wires during their charge on an Axis bunker.

Retreat of the Communist forces 
The Partisans cancelled their attacks on Kraljevo based on the order of the communist supreme command and their headquarters in Serbia. The first units retreating from the siege were communist units, the Dragačevo Battalion which retreated on 23 October and three out of five companies of the Ljubić Battalion retreated before the end of October and sent to Čačak to fight against the Chetnik forces.

Conflict among rebels for control over Čačak, Požega and Užice 

In the night between 2 and 3 November 1941 the communist commanders forged a plan to attack Požega, after they managed to resist Chetnik attack on their positions in Užice. The information that about 200 Partisans attacked Chetnik security forces of the Preljina airport was quickly reported to Major Đurić who held positions at the Kraljevo siege on the same night.

Draža Mihailović ordered on 5 November to Captain Bogdan Marjanović to intensify his actions and quickly capture Čačak, while Deroko was ordered to contact Marjanović and to take 2/3 his troops, artillery and vehicles to capture Čačak, while rest of his troops were ordered to secure area toward Raška and road between Kraljevo and Čačak.

Not all Chetnik forces left the siege of Kraljevo, but most of Chetniks did leave the siege. Deroko and Chetnik detachment under his command headed toward Čačak through the village of Mrčajevci and easily took over Preljina from Partisans, crossed river Čemernica and positioned his forces that also included artillery on Ljubić hill, near the monument to Tanasko Rajić. The Chetnik Captain Jovan Deroko was commander of the Chetnik artillery on Ljubić. The communist forces forced Chetniks out of Ljubić, captured their artillery and killed Deroko on 6 November 1941.

Aftermath 
On 20 November 1941, the communist forces and Yugoslav Army in the Fatherland signed truce while the German offensive in December 1941 defeated both parties. The Communists retreated to Montenegro and Bosnia while Mihailović and a small number of his soldiers was forced to flee constant German chases. The Yugoslav Army in the Fatherland and Partisans held each other as morally responsible for Kragujevac and Kraljevo massacres while Mihailović decided to resolve the communist question once for all.

At the beginning of 1942 some Chetniks legalized with Nedić administration buried Deroko besides the grave of Tanasko Rajić in Ljubić, but communists dig out his body in 1945 and disposed it on unknown location. Eventually, Soviet Red Army and Yugoslav communist forces captured Kraljevo in Autumn 1944 and established a communist regime which lasted for about fifty years. After the regime of communists in Serbia ended the Government of Serbia  and its Ministry of Justice established the commission to research atrocities that were committed by members of the Yugoslav Partisan Movement after they gained control over Serbia in Autumn 1944. According to the report of this commission, out of 55,554 registered victims of communist purges in Serbia the new communist regime in Kraljevo killed 240 people while 28 people are missing.

Historical sources 
Two different parties that participated in the siege of Kraljevo have opposing and conflicting views on the events. Although both communists and Chetniks bravely fought in this battle, the post-war historiography published by Communist party denied Chetnik contribution labeling them with different defamatory expressions.

The propaganda of local historiography created by the winning partisans was service of their communist ideology and presented selected parts of the Siege of Kraljevo to create historical consciousness almost completely opposed to real events. For the half of the century the official historiography considered Chetniks as most responsible for failure and lifting the siege of Kraljevo. The Chetniks were presented as deceitful and untrustworthy whose combat value was minimal, while notable examples of brave individuals which were impossible to ignore were neutralized by exerting the Chetniks' betrayal as their persistent behaviour. The Partisans were depicted as heroically brave with almost perfect characteristics who had a role of Promethean heroes whose enemies, before all Chetniks, were forces whose role was menace. The communist interpretation of the conflict with Yugoslav royalists was symbol of defeat of "counter-revolution", "reaction" and "traitors", particularly because this conflict reached its maximum on 7 November 1941 when communists in Čačak organized celebration of the anniversary of the October Revolution.

In Chetnik interpretation of conflict with Partisans, Deroko received the fame of new Tanasko Rajić. It is important to consider that communists detachment from Čačak left the siege of Požega in period 22–24 October to reinforce communist forces in Užice. Taking in consideration the contemporary situation and conflicts between two rebel groups in Čačak, Požega and Užice, it can be concluded that this broader conflict between two rebel groups caused lifting the siege of Kraljevo.

References

Sources

Further reading 
 

Battles of World War II involving Chetniks
Battles of World War II involving Germany
Yugoslavia in World War II
1941 in Serbia
October 1941 events